The Djibloho Dam is a gravity dam on the Wele River near Djibloho in Wele-Nzas, Equatorial Guinea. The primary purpose of the dam is hydroelectric power generation and it supports a  power station. Construction on the project began in 2008 and it was inaugurated in October 2012. It is the largest hydroelectric power station in the country. Most of the project's cost was funded by the host government but some funds were provided by the Chinese government. Sinohydro constructed the dam and power station.

References

Dams completed in 2012
Energy infrastructure completed in 2012
Dams in Equatorial Guinea
Hydroelectric power stations in Equatorial Guinea
Gravity dams
Wele-Nzas